Amalsad is a Village in Gujarat, India. It is located in the Gandevi sub-district of Navsari. It is a prominent rail junction on the Mumbai-Vadodara line of the Western Railway (India). The three closest localities to Amalsad are Gandevi, Kachholi, and Billimora. It is famous as the center of Sapodilla trade and exports in the local area of Gujarat, where 5 to 6 tons of Sapodilla get sold in a day during the season. It is also the birthplace of famous Gujarati artist Kalaguru Shri Jashubhai Naik.

See also
Amalsad railway station

Cities and towns in Navsari district